Yopohué (also spelled Yopohua) is a town in south-central Ivory Coast. It is a sub-prefecture of Gagnoa Department in Gôh Region, Gôh-Djiboua District.

Yopohué was a commune until March 2012, when it became one of 1126 communes nationwide that were abolished.

In 2014, the population of the sub-prefecture of Yopohué was 28,60728,607.

Villages
The 7 villages of the sub-prefecture of Yopohué and their population in 2014 are :
 Bahompa  (1 391)
 Boko  (3 110)
 Didia  (2 523)
 Nagadoukou  (6 816)
 Sané-Gazé  (3 969)
 Yopohué  (4 048)
 Ziplignan  (6 750)

References

Sub-prefectures of Gôh
Former communes of Ivory Coast